Norma Lee Sahlin (September 9, 1927 – June 22, 2005) was a figure skating coach and a national level competitor.

Personal life 
Sahlin was born in Ionia, Michigan. She started skating in Sault Ste. Marie, Michigan under coach Pierre Brunet. She later moved to Chicago to train under Bill Swallender. She competed in pairs with her husband, Wally Sahlin. They won the junior title at the 1947 Midwestern Sectional Championships. The pair skated with the Ice Follies for three seasons, before decided to live in Colorado Springs, Colorado. They also have a son, Michael, who with his partner won the junior pairs title at the 1972 Midwestern Sectional Championships, 25 years after his parents.

Skating career 
Sahlin coached Charles Tickner to win the 1978 World Figure Skating Championships, bronze at the 1980 World Figure Skating Championships, and bronze at the 1980 Winter Olympics. She also coached Barbara Brown and Doug Berndt at the 1972 Winter Olympics. Other students included Tom Zakrajsek for seven years and Jill Trenary for eighteen months. In total she coached students at seven World Championships.

Awards 
She and her husband, Wally Sahlin, were inducted into the United States Figure Skating Hall of Fame in 2004. Other awards include:
 Honorary Member of the Professional Skaters Association (PSA)
 inducted to PSA Coaches Hall of Fame in January 2005
 Betty Berens Award in 2003
 Sportswoman of Colorado Superior Achievement in 1978

References

American figure skating coaches
American female pair skaters
Sportspeople from Michigan
People from Ionia, Michigan
Female sports coaches
2005 deaths
1927 births
20th-century American women
21st-century American women